Darko Stošić (born February 9, 1992) is a Serbian mixed martial artist currently fighting for Konfrontacja Sztuk Walki (KSW) in the Heavyweight division. He is the former Final Fight Championship (FFC) heavyweight champion and he also competed in the Ultimate Fighting Championship (UFC). He is currently ranked #1 in the KSW Heavyweight rankings.

Background 
Stošić was born in Laćarak, Serbia in 1992. He attended Triva Vitasović Lebarnik Primary School where he started his judo lessons in LSK Judo Club in Laćarak. He won many judo championships in Serbia and the Balkan region before he went to compete in kickboxing.
 He transitioned to MMA at the age of 18, training at the Car Dušan Silni gym along with Gagi Tešanović and Rođa Radosavljević, after Tesla Fighting Championship was formed, in hope to fight under the promotion.

Judo career
Stošić started training in judo at the age of seven until 2012 under Miša Jovetić. He was the judo national champion 10 times and twice Balkan champion which he was awarded the best athlete in MMA Red Star.

Mixed martial arts career

Early career 
Stošić started his professional MMA career in 2012 and fought under various promotions, namely Tesla Fighting Championship, Adrenalin Freefight Challenge and Final Fight Championship where he was the heavyweight champion. He amassed the record of 12–1 prior signed by UFC in December 2017.

Ultimate Fighting Championship
Stošić made his UFC promotion debut on July 22, 2018, at UFC Fight Night: Shogun vs. Smith against Jeremy Kimball. He won the fight via technical knockout.

Stošić was scheduled to face Magomed Ankalaev on February 23, 2019, at UFC on ESPN+ 3. However, Stošić pulled out of the fight on January 23, 2019 citing injury. Ankalaev instead faced promotional newcomer Klidson Abreu.

His second UFC fight came on June 1, 2019, against Devin Clark at UFC Fight Night: Gustafsson vs. Smith. He lost the fight via unanimous decision.

Stošić faced Kennedy Nzechukwu on August 3, 2019, at UFC on ESPN: Covington vs. Lawler. He lost the fight via unanimous decision.

Stošić faced Jamahal Hill on January 25 2020 at UFC Fight Night 166. He lost the fight via unanimous decision.

Stošić was released by the UFC on February 11, 2020.

KSW

It was announced in April 2020, that Darko was signing a 4 fight deal with KSW. For his organizational debut, Stošić is scheduled to fight the five-fight KSW veteran Michał Włodarek at KSW 58. The fight was later postponed for KSW 59: Fight Code. He won the bout via KO in the second round.

Stošić, as a replacement for Jay Silva, faced Michał Kita on June 5, 2021, at KSW 61. He controlled most of the bout and finished Kita in the first round via ground and pound.

Stošić faced Michał Andryszak on September 4, 2021, at KSW 63: Crime of The Century. He won the bout via split decision.

Stošić fought for the KSW Heavyweight Championship against reigning champion Phil De Fries at KSW 67 on February 26, 2022. He lost the bout via TKO after tapping due to combination of exhaustion and damage in the fifth round.

Stošić faced Michał Kita in a rematch at KSW 74: De Fries vs. Prasel on September 10, 2022. He won the bout in the second round, knocking Kita out.

Brave CF 
Stošić faced Shamil Gaziev on February 18, 2023 at BRAVE CF 69, losing the bout via TKO stoppage in the first round.

Championships and accomplishments

Judo
2008 Serbian U17 under 90 kg Champion
2008 Balkan U17 under 90 kg Champion
2010 Serbian U20 under 100 kg Champion
2010 Serbian U23 under 100 kg Champion 
2011 Serbian U20 under 100 kg Champion
2011 Balkan U20 under 100 kg Champion

Mixed martial arts
Final Fight Championship 
 FFC Heavyweight Championship (One time)
Two successful title defenses

Mixed martial arts record

|-
|Loss
|align=center|17–6
|Shamil Gaziev
|TKO (punches)
|BRAVE CF 69
|
|align=center|1
|align=center|2:54
|Belgrade, Serbia
|
|-
|Win
|align=center|17–5
|Michał Kita
|KO (punches)
|KSW 74: De Fries vs. Prasel
|
|align=center|2
|align=center|2:54
|Ostrów Wielkopolski, Poland
|
|-
|Loss
|align=center|16–5
|Phil De Fries
|TKO (submission to punches)
|KSW 67: De Fries vs. Stošić
|
|align=center|5
|align=center|3:44
|Warsaw, Poland
|
|-
|Win
|align=center|16–4
| Michał Andryszak
| Decision (split)
| KSW 63: Crime of The Century
|
|align=center| 3
|align=center| 5:00
|Warszawa, Poland
| 
|-
|Win
|align=center|15–4
|Michał Kita
|TKO (punches)
|KSW 61: To Fight or Not To Fight
|
|align=center|1
|align=center|4:05
|Gdańsk, Poland
|
|-
|Win
|align=center|14–4
|Michał Włodarek
|KO (punches)
|KSW 59: Fight Code
|
|align=center| 2
|align=center| 4:39
|Łódź, Poland
|
|-
|Loss
|align=center|13–4
|Jamahal Hill
|Decision (unanimous)
|UFC Fight Night: Blaydes vs. dos Santos 
|
|align=center|3
|align=center|5:00
|Raleigh, North Carolina, United States
|
|-
|Loss
|align=center|13–3
|Kennedy Nzechukwu
|Decision (unanimous)
|UFC on ESPN: Covington vs. Lawler
|
|align=center| 3
|align=center| 5:00
|Newark, New Jersey, United States
|
|-
|Loss
|align=center|13–2
|Devin Clark
|Decision (unanimous)
|UFC Fight Night: Gustafsson vs. Smith
|
|align=center| 3
|align=center| 5:00
|Stockholm, Sweden
|
|-
|Win
|align=center|13–1
|Jeremy Kimball
|TKO (elbows and punches)
|UFC Fight Night: Shogun vs. Smith
|
|align=center| 1
|align=center| 3:13
|Hamburg, Germany
|
|-
|Win
|align=center|12–1
|Tomasz Czerwiński
|TKO (punches)
|Collision Fighting League 1
|
|align=center| 1
|align=center| N/A
|Belgrade, Serbia
|
|-
|Win
|align=center|11–1
|Emil Zahariev
|TKO (leg kicks)
|Final Fight Championship 28
|
|align=center| 1
|align=center| 2:07
|Athens, Greece
|
|-
|Win
|align=center|10–1
|Dion Staring
|Decision (unanimous)
|Final Fight Championship 27
|
|align=center| 3
|align=center| 5:00
|Zagreb, Croatia
|
|-
|Win
|align=center|9–1
|Dion Staring
|Decision (majority)
|Final Fight Championship 26
|
|align=center| 3
|align=center| 5:00
|Linz, Austria
|
|-
|Win
|align=center|8–1
|Manny Murillo
|TKO (punches)
|Final Fight Championship 25
|
|align=center| 1
|align=center| 0:56
|Springfield, Massachusetts, United States
|
|-
|Win
|align=center|7–1
|Ivan Vitasović
|Submission (americana)
|Final Fight Championship 21
|
|align=center| 1
|align=center| 2:59
|Rijeka, Croatia
|
|-
|Win
|align=center|6–1
|Hatef Moeil
|TKO (punches)
|Final Fight Championship 19
|
|align=center| 2 
|align=center| 1:17
|Linz, Austria
|
|-
|Win
|align=center|5–1
|Dionysis Papadopoulos
|TKO (punches)
|Final Fight Championship 7
|
|align=center| 1
|align=center| 0:59
|Sarajevo, Bosnia and Herzegovina
|
|-
|Loss
|align=center|4–1
|Jiří Procházka
|TKO (punches)
|GCF Challenge: Cage Fight 5
|
|align=center| 1
|align=center| 1:09
|Brno, Czech Republic
|
|-
|Win
|align=center|4–0
|Rizvan Kuniev
|Decision (unanimous)
|Tesla Fighting Championship 4
|
|align=center| 3
|align=center| 5:00
|Pomoravlje, Serbia
|
|-
|Win
|align=center|3–0
|Saša Lazić
|TKO (punches)
|Master Challenge 2
|
|align=center| 1
|align=center| 2:19
|Pomoravlje, Serbia
|
|-
|Win
|align=center|2–0
|Rok Kokotec
|TKO (punches)
|AFC 6
|
|align=center| 1
|align=center| 0:30
|Trbovlje, Slovenia
|
|-
|Win
|align=center|1–0
|Željko Sarić
|Decision (unanimous)
|Tesla Fighting Championship 3
|
|align=center| 3
|align=center| 5:00
|Belgrade, Serbia
|
|-

See also 
 List of current KSW fighters
 List of male mixed martial artists

References

External links 
  
 

1992 births
Living people
Sportspeople from Sremska Mitrovica
Light heavyweight mixed martial artists
Heavyweight mixed martial artists
Serbian male mixed martial artists
Mixed martial artists utilizing judo
Mixed martial artists utilizing kickboxing
Ultimate Fighting Championship male fighters
Serbian male judoka
Serbian male kickboxers